Darryl Anthony Powell (born 15 November 1971) is a sports agent and former professional footballer who made more than 350 appearances in the Football League and Premier League and played international football for the Jamaica national team. He usually played as a central midfielder.

Career
The son of a Reggae musician, he was born in Lambeth, London, and his career included spells at English clubs Portsmouth, Derby County, Birmingham City, Sheffield Wednesday and Nottingham Forest, as well as a stint at Colorado Rapids in the USA. Along with his Derby teammate Deon Burton he was one of the Reggae Boyz playing for Jamaica in France 98. Powell was sent off in the match versus Argentina in Paris, a 5–0 defeat.

Personal life
As of 2015, he works as a sports agent.

Powell has also appeared as a guest on the beach soccer circuit, playing for the England national beach soccer team in an exhibition game in Birmingham.

References

External links
 
 

1971 births
English footballers
Jamaican footballers
English people of Jamaican descent
Jamaica international footballers
1998 FIFA World Cup players
2000 CONCACAF Gold Cup players
Premier League players
Portsmouth F.C. players
Derby County F.C. players
Birmingham City F.C. players
Sheffield Wednesday F.C. players
Colorado Rapids players
Nottingham Forest F.C. players
Black British sportsmen
Major League Soccer players
Footballers from the London Borough of Lambeth
Living people
Association football midfielders
English expatriate sportspeople in the United States
Expatriate soccer players in the United States
English expatriate footballers